"A Christmas Play" is a 1965 Australian television play based on the work by Carl Orff. It aired as an episode of Wednesday Theatre.

Cast
Justine Rettick
George Whaley
singers from the Melba Conservatorium, St Paul's Cathedral Boys choir

Production
It was shot in Melbourne. Choreography was by Rex Reid.

That year the ABC also broadcast a ten minute TV play The Little Woodcarver written by Keith Smith, about a shepherd boy who lived in the Alps. And An Old Man and Christmas starring Lou Vernon.

Reception
The Canberra Times said the production "provided a feast for the eye that was not overshadowed by the musical fare. Faull is particularly at home in exploiting the technical resources that television offers."

References

1965 television plays
1965 Australian television episodes
1960s Australian television plays
Black-and-white television episodes
Wednesday Theatre (season 1) episodes